Botanical gardens in México have collections consisting entirely of México native and endemic species; most have a collection that include plants from around the world. There are botanical gardens and arboreta in all states and territories of México, most are administered by local governments, some are privately owned.
 Alta Cima Botanical Garden
 Asociación Mexicana de Jardines Botánicos
 Jardín Botánico Campo Experimental "Todos Santos"
 Jardín Botánico Conunitario
 Jardín Botánico Culiacán
 Jardín Botánico de Acapulco
 Jardín Botánico de Ciceana
 Jardín Botánico de la FES, Cuautitlán-UNAM
 Jardín Botánico del Instituto de Biología (UNAM)
 Jardín Botánico de Universidad Juárez del Estado de Durango
 Jardín Botánico "Dr Alferdo Barrera Marín"
 Jardin Botánico "El Charco del Ingenio"
 Clavijero Botanical Garden
 Jardín Botánico "Ignacio Rodríguez de Alconedo"
 Jardín Botánico "Jerzy Rzedowski Rotter"
 Jardín Botánico Regional "Cassiano Conzatti" de CIIDIR-IPN-Oaxaca – see Cassiano Conzatti
 Jardín Etnobotánico de Oaxaca
 Jardín Botánico Regional de Cadereyta "Ing. Manuel González de Cosío"
 Jardín Botánico Regional "El Soconusco"
 Jardín Botánico Regional Xiitbal nek'
 Jardín Botánico "Rey Netzahualcóyotl"
 Jardín Etnobotánico 'Francisco Peláez R'
 Jardín Etnobótanico Museo de Medicina Tradicional y Herbolaria del INAH
 Jardín Etnobotánico Tzapoteca
 Proyecto Jardín Botánico del Desierto Chihuahuense
Faustino Miranda Botanical Garden
 Vallarta Botanical Gardens

References 

Mexico
Botanical gardens